Benguelasa minor is a moth in the family Gelechiidae. It was described by Oleksiy V. Bidzilya and Wolfram Mey in 2011. It is found in Namibia.

References

Gelechiinae
Moths described in 2011